Bárbara Marie Almaraz Preciado (born 4 May 1979) is an American-born Mexican former women's international footballer who played as a defender. She was a member of the Mexico women's national football team. She was part of the team at the 1999 FIFA Women's World Cup.

See also 
 List of Mexico women's international footballers

References

1979 births
Living people
Citizens of Mexico through descent
Mexican women's footballers
Mexico women's international footballers
1999 FIFA Women's World Cup players
Women's association football defenders
Sportspeople from Oxnard, California
American sportspeople of Mexican descent
American women's soccer players
USC Trojans women's soccer players